A passerelle clause is a clause in treaties of the European Union that allows the alteration of a legislative procedure without a formal amendment of the treaties. The use of a passerelle clause required unanimity of all member states although member states with opt-outs and those not participating in an area under enhanced cooperation may not have a vote. Unlike formal treaty revision their use does not require national ratification. Passerelle is French for a 'small bridge'.

General clauses
As of the coming into force of the Treaty of Lisbon, there are two general passerelle clauses which apply to all decision making under the treaties. They are subject to the following preconditions:

 It must be approved by the European Parliament given by an absolute majority of its members (at least 376 out of a total of 751 MEPs must vote in favour), and
 National parliaments must be notified of any intended use of a general passerelle clause. If any objects to a proposal within a 6 month period the proposal fails.

Provided the preconditions are met, the European Council acting unanimously can:

 replace unanimous voting in the Council of Ministers with qualified majority voting, and
 move from a special legislative procedure to the ordinary legislative procedure.

Specific clauses
There are a further six specific clauses. These apply to specific policy areas and may be easier to adopt than the general clauses as they require fewer preconditions. In four of them it is the Council of Ministers rather than the European Council which may the decision to use the clause. The European Parliament has no role in four of the clauses and is limited to being consulted in the other two. A national parliamentary veto is only retained in one of them.

European Council acting alone

 Under Article 31 TEU the European Council may expand on the list of foreign policy matters in which the Council of Ministers may vote using qualified majority voting.
 Under Article 312 TFEU the European Council may adopt a decision allowing the Council of Ministers to act by a qualified majority when adopting regulations laying down the multiannual financial framework.

Enhanced cooperation

 Under Article 333 TFEU member states participating in an enhanced cooperation may vote to:
 move to qualified majority voting, or
 move from a special legislative procedure to the ordinary legislative
 within in that enhanced cooperation. The decision is made unanimously by the participating member states within the Council of Ministers. In the event a move from a special to the ordinary legislative is proposed, the European Parliament must be consulted.

Council of Ministers on the proposal of the European Commission after having consulted the European Parliament

 Under Article 153 TFEU the Council, acting unanimously on a proposal from the Commission, after consulting the European Parliament change decision making in certain areas affecting the right of workers from a special (unanimity with EP consultation) to the ordinary legislative procedure.
 Under Article 192 TFEU the Council, acting unanimously on a proposal from the Commission, after consulting the European Parliament change decision making in certain areas affecting the environmental matters from a special (unanimity with EP consultation) to the ordinary legislative procedure.

Council of Ministers on the proposal of the European Commission after no national parliament has objected with a six-month notification period

 Under Article 81 TFEU the Council of Ministers may adopt a decision determining those aspects of family law with cross-border implications which may be the subject of acts adopted by the ordinary legislative procedure.

See also
Revision procedures for the Treaty of Lisbon
European Union legislative procedure
European Union Act 2011

References

External links
 Passerelle clauses, brake clauses and accelerator clauses
 Legislative procedures
 Revisions to the Treaties
 Select Committee on European Union Tenth Report: Chapter 3: Simplified Treaty Revision and Passerelles
 UK Parliamentary Reply

Treaties of the European Union